The Bob Jones Memorial is a darts tournament that has been held since 2009.

List of winners

Men's

Women's

Tournament records
 Most wins 2: .   Dave Cameron, Ross Snook.
 Most Finals 3:   Dave Cameron. 
 Most Semi Finals 3:   Dave Cameron, Ross Snook.
 Most Quarter Finals 3:  Ross Snook,   Dave Cameron,  Terry Hayhurst,  Andre Carman,   Guy Connelly . 
 Most Appearances 5:  Dan Olson,  Jayson Barlow,  Martin Tremblay . 
 Most Prize Money won C$ C$2,120 :  Dave Cameron. .
 Youngest Winner age :  .
 Oldest Winner age : .

See also
List of BDO ranked tournaments
List of WDF tournaments

References

External links

 National Darts Federation of Canada

Darts tournaments
2004 establishments in Ontario
Recurring sporting events established in 2004